was a Japanese actor most recognizable for his intense, eccentric yakuza film roles and his artificially enlarged cheekbones. He appeared in some 300 films but is best known in the West for his performance in the cult film Branded to Kill (1967). In Japan, he is also known by the nickname  for his popular role in the Western Quick Draw Joe (1961).

Early life

Joe Shishido was born in the Kita Ward of Osaka, Japan. He had two older brothers, one younger sister and a younger brother who also became an actor under the name Eiji Go. Shishido attended schools in Tokyo and Miyagi. In 1952, he graduated from high school and enrolled in the theatre course at Nihon University. Two years later, he auditioned for the Nikkatsu Company's New Face contest. He was one of 21 selected from 8,000 applicants. Shishido dropped out of school and began working for Nikkatsu, appearing in small film roles.

Nikkatsu
In 1954, Joe Shishido signed on as a contract player at Nikkatsu. Studio bosses encouraged Shishido to change his name, as popular tales of the samurai Miyamoto Musashi contained a villain named Shishido, and they were trying to model him into a romantic lead. Shishido refused. His first major role was in Policeman's Diary (1955, Keisatsu Nikki), in which he played a young patrolman who challenges a police chief in a kendo (bamboo sword fighting) match.

Displeased with his middling success in melodramas and "blandly handsome features", Shishido underwent cheek augmentation surgery in 1957, increasing the size of his cheekbones. His altered look has been described both as "ruggedly handsome", and as chipmunk-like. Afterward, he began getting bigger parts, predominantly as villains in action movies. Two of his biggest roles in the late 1950s and early 1960s were opposite Akira Kobayashi in the Wataridori ("Birds of Passage") series, and Keiichirō Akagi in the Kenjū Buraichō series. When Akagi died in a go-karting accident, Shishido replaced him as Nikkatsu's action star. His first starring role was in Joe of Aces-Gambling for a Living aka Rokudenashi Kagyō directed by Buichi Saitō. The film was a success and spawned two immediate sequels, Joe of Aces-Body Guard and Joe of Aces-Give and Take'7 (1961). He gained national popularity and the lifelong nickname "Joe the Ace" ("Eisu no Jō") for his eponymous role in Quick Draw Joe (1961), in which he played the "third-fastest draw in the world—0.65 seconds."

Though he worked predominantly in comic action roles, Shishido also gained a tough-guy loner image in such films as Seijun Suzuki's Youth of the Beast, (1963) in which he played an ex-cop who infiltrates two rival yakuza gangs. Shishido is best known in the West for films he made with Suzuki, e.g. Detective Bureau 2-3: Go to Hell, Bastards! (1963) and Gate of Flesh (1964). His best known film internationally is Suzuki's Branded to Kill (1967), in which he starred as the number three hitman in Japan. The film received only moderate success on its original release, due largely to poor promotion by Nikkatsu stemming from the studio's growing disaffection with Suzuki, which ended with the director's firing. Shishido later recalled seeing the film with friends and finding the theater nearly deserted.

Nikkatsu action movies began to lose favour through the late 1960s and production was scaled back resulting in fewer jobs for Shishido. He began taking roles with other companies and in television, which were primarily of a comic nature. He also starred in Nikkatsu "new action" films such as the all-star vehicle Yakuza Bird of Passage:Bad Guys' Work (1969), with Akira Kobayashi and Tetsuya Watari, and Bloody Battle (1971). In 1971, Shishido ended his contract and left the failing company, which had transitioned into softcore roman porno ("romantic pornography") films in order to stay profitable.

Free agent
Joe Shishido continued to work in television and appeared in films for other studios such as the fifth installment of Toei's highly popular yakuza series Battles Without Honor and Humanity: Final Episode (1974). By this time, yakuza films had begun to lose favour with the public, and Shishido ceased appearing in those types of roles. Over the next 20 years, he focused predominately on television with occasional film appearances, including Exchange Students (1982), Bound for the Fields, the Mountains, and the Seacoast (1986) and A Mature Woman (1994). His roles in Kaizo Hayashi's Mike Hama: Private Eye (a play on Mike Hammer) trilogy marked a reemergence of his tough-guy persona. The trilogy included The Most Terrible Time in My Life (1994), The Stairway to the Distant Past (1995) and The Trap (1996).

On February 4, 2013, his house was destroyed in a fire. He was not at home at the time, and no one was injured.

Shishido was found in his home on January 21, 2020, having died on January 18, 2020. He was survived by his three children.

Partial filmography

Films
 1955 Keisatsu Nikki - directed Seiji Hisamatsu
 1955 The Maid's Kid - d. by Tomotaka Tasaka
 1957  Shori-sha
 1958 Rusty Knife - d. Toshio Masuda
 1958 Voice Without a Shadow (影なき声 Kagenaki koe) - d. Seijun Suzuki
 1961 Quick Draw Joe - d. Takashi Nomura
 1962 Mekishiko Mushuku
 1963 Detective Bureau 2-3: Go to Hell Bastards! (探偵事務所２３ 銭と女に弱い男 Tantei jimusho 23: Kutabare akutōdomo) - d. by Seijun Suzuki
 1963 Youth of the Beast (野獣の青春 Yaju no seishun) - d. Seijun Suzuki
 1964 Cruel Gun Story - d. Takumi Furukawa
 1964 Gate of Flesh (肉体の門 Nikutai no mon) - d. Seijun Suzuki
 1965 Abare Kishidō (あばれ騎士道) (1965) - d.Isamu Kosugi
 1967 A Colt Is My Passport (拳銃は俺のパスポート Koruto wa ore no pasupoto) - d. Takashi Nomura
 1967 Massacre Gun (みな殺しの拳銃 Minagoroshi no kenjū) - d. Yasuharu Hasebe
 1967 Branded to Kill (殺しの烙印 Koroshi no rakuin) - d. Seijun Suzuki
 1968 Retaliation (縄張はもらった ) - d. Yasuharu Hasebe
 1969 The Wandering Guitarist - d.Buichi Saitō
 1971 A Man′s World  - d. Yasuharu Hasebe
 1974 Battles Without Honor and Humanity: Final Episode (仁義なき戦い 完結篇 Jingi naki tatakai: Chojo sakusen) - d. Kinji Fukasaku
 1974 New Battles Without Honor and Humanity (新 仁義なき戦い Shin Jingi naki tatakai) - d. Kinji Fukasaku
 1977 A Tale of Sorrow and Sadness (悲愁物語 Hishu monogatari) - d. Seijun Suzuki
 1978 Bandits vs. Samurai Squadron (雲霧仁左衛門 Kumokiri nizaemon) - d. Hideo Gosha
 1981 Edo Porn (北斎漫画 Hokusai manga) - d. Kaneto Shindō
 1982 Tenkōsei
 1985 Caribe: Symphony of Love (カリブ・愛のシンフォニー ) - d. Norifumi Suzuki
 1986 The Samurai (ザ・サムライ Za samurai - d. Norifumi Suzuki
 1987 Fugitive Alien - d. Minoru Kanaya & Kiyosumi Kuzakawa
 1988 Tokyo: The Last Megalopolis - d. Akio Jissoji
 1994 The Most Terrible Time in My Life (我が人生最悪の時 Waga jinsei saiaku no toki) - d. Kaizo Hayashi
 1995 The Stairway to the Distant Past (遥かな時代の階段を Harukana jidai no kaidan) o - d. Kaizo Hayashi
 1996 The Trap (罠 Wana)  - d. Kaizo Hayashi
 1997 To Love (愛する Aisuru) - d. Kei Kumai
 2001 Kisaragi

Television
 1973 Kunitori Monogatari – Shibata Katsuie
 1974 Katsu Kaishū 
 1973 Shinsho Taikōki (1973), Nakagawa Kiyohide
 1976 Daitokai Tatakaino Hibi 
 1976 Kaze to Kumo to Niji to -
 1978 Star Wolf - Captain Joe
 1981 Pro Hunter - Yuzo Kikushima
 1988 Takeda Shingen – Hara Toratane
 1996 Hideyoshi – Honda Masanobu
 2000 Aoi Tokugawa Sandai – Honda Tadakatsu
 2001 The Kindaichi Case Files – Fujio Tashiro
 2009 Tenchijin – Naoe Kagetsuna

References

External links
 
 Midnight Eye interview: Joe Shishido and Toshio Masuda
 
 
 

1933 births
2020 deaths
Male actors from Osaka
Japanese male film actors
Japanese male television actors
Nihon University alumni
20th-century Japanese male actors